Novaya Sotnya is a rural locality (a khutor) in Kopanyanskoye Rural Settlement, Olkhovatsky District, Voronezh Oblast, Russia. The population was 169 as of 2010.

Geography 
Novaya Sotnya is located 28 km northwest of Olkhovatka (the district's administrative centre) by road. Kopanaya 1-ya is the nearest rural locality.

References 

Rural localities in Olkhovatsky District